Fergusonia is a monotypic genus of flowering plants in the family Rubiaceae. The genus contains only one species, viz. Fergusonia zeylanica, which is only found in southern India and western Sri Lanka.

References

Monotypic Rubiaceae genera
Taxa named by Joseph Dalton Hooker